Cephas Barker Mark (July 31, 1872 – 1942) was a druggist and political figure in Saskatchewan. He represented Rosetown in the Legislative Assembly of Saskatchewan, from 1912 to 1917, as a Liberal.

Mark was born in Little Britain, Ontario, the son of Joseph Mark and Philippa Netherton. He was educated in Lindsay and at the Toronto School of Pharmacy. In 1904, Cephas Barker Mark married Elizabeth Edith Swain, where they resided in Rosetown.

References 

Saskatchewan Liberal Party MLAs
1872 births
1942 deaths
Canadian pharmacists
People from Kawartha Lakes
People from Rosetown
University of Toronto alumni